Mirko Corsano (born 28 October 1973 in Casarano) is a volleyball player from Italy, who won the bronze medal with the men's national team at the 2000 Summer Olympics. Playing as a libero, he claimed his first title for the Azzurri in 1999 at European Championship in Vienna, Austria.

Awards

Individuals
 2001 European Championship "Best Libero"
 2005 European Championship "Best Libero"
 2005 FIVB World Grand Champions Cup "Best Libero"
 2008 Summer Olympics "Best Libero"

References
 Profile

1973 births
Living people
Italian men's volleyball players
Olympic bronze medalists for Italy
Volleyball players at the 2000 Summer Olympics
Volleyball players at the 2008 Summer Olympics
Olympic volleyball players of Italy
Olympic medalists in volleyball
Medalists at the 2000 Summer Olympics